Franz Bendel (23 March 18333 July 1874) was a German Bohemian pianist, composer and teacher.

Bendel was born in Schönlinde, Bohemia, Austrian Empire.  He was a student of Franz Liszt for five years in Weimar. From 1862, he lived in Berlin and taught at Theodor Kullak's Music Academy, Neue Akademie der Tonkunst. He was also the author of over four hundred compositions, many of them for the piano, including one piano concerto.

Bendel was a superb pianist who toured extensively until his death from typhoid fever in Boston while on an American tour.  He was aged 41.

Life
Franz Bendel was a son of an elementary school teacher. After the first instruction from his father, he became a student of Josef Proksch. Through his teacher, who encouraged him very much, Bendel later went to Franz Liszt in Weimar, where he also met Wendelin Weißheimer.

	In 1848, Count Otto von Westphal hired Bendel as a house and music teacher. He held this office for 14 years. Bendel had already emerged a composer by 1885 when Proksch performed a mass by him in Prague. In 1862 Bendel settled in Berlin and became a lecturer at the Neue Akademie der Tonkunst. He lived and worked there until his death, only interrupted by several small concert tours, such as Prague in 1863, which were praised in the press. In 1866, he also worked at Carl Tausig’s Schule des höheren Klavierspiels for some time.

As a performer as well as a creative artist, Bendel pursued the direction of the serious and solid, and his numerous trips accompanied by the best success (the last one even led him to America occasionally at the Boston Music Festival) were unable to detract from the ideality of his pursuit. He was even able to participate as a concert pianist at Patrick Gilmore’s National Peace Jubilee in Boston in 1872. Bendel was under an engagement with the Steinways for a series of eighty concerts in 1874, but typhoid fever caused his death after four days illness in July 1873. His grave monument is located in Berlin-Mitte, Oranienburg. First French Cemetery.

Legacy
After his death, Bendel’s music lost much of its deserved recognition, coming as it did at a time when Wagner was revolutionizing. One of Bendel’s publishers, Augener & Co., based in London, and their journal, The Monthly Musical Record, continually reviewed his music after Bendel’s passing. In regard to his death, the journal stated, “much to be regretted, and will be regretted more and more, for the qualities of his compositions are becoming increasingly rare in pianoforte music.” Some of Bendel's notable students were Silas Pratt, Edward Morris Bowman, and Max Schwarz. He set text by Louise Strantz to music in his Wiegenlied.

Style
Bendel was most active as a composer. Of his compositions, including four masses, symphonies, a piano concerto, and a piano trio; the salon-style piano works and numerous songs have found widespread use. The number of his compositions for the piano (light and descriptive pieces, Fantasias, Idylls & etc.) is over one hundred. The most admired are the Fantasias on a theme from Gounod's “Faust and Margaret,” Meyerbeer's “Afrikanerin,” and the Bohemian National songs (Op. 8, 45, and 47). In Bendel's tone poems, Franz Liszt's predilection for symphonic treatment also comes to the fore. The powerful way of performing as a piano virtuoso had also become his own. Bendel's teaching under Proksch kept a remnant of inclination for seriousness and solidity in his composition.

Similar to the nocturnes of John Field, Bendel wrote many Stimmungsbilder (mood pictures). His preference for mountain trips were expressed with a series of these type of pieces, with examples from Schweizer Bilder, Op. 137 and books Am Genfer See Op. 139. Some of these pieces were accompanied with a brief explanation of the content. When describing these pieces, C.F. Weitzman says, “Bendel portrays the impressions of his journeyings in the fresh air of the valleys and heights of Switzerland; and in the “Sechs deutsche Märchenbilder” (Op. 135, Hamburg, Hugo Pohle), illustrated with more striking colors, the dream-like, weird, and bizarre scenes of these Fantasiestücke pass before our inner vision with dramatic animation.”

For a span of time, The Monthly Musical Record reviewed Bendel's works, giving description of his different approaches to his own style. The journal introduced his Rococo-Tanz with this quote: “Now, Franz Bendel did not simulate qualities he did not possess; but, on the contrary, cheerfully applied himself to the cultivation of the gifts he had been endowed with, which, moreover, were worth at least as much as many gifts of a prouder and more pretentious nature. What we find in his works is elegance, grace, ease, and charm in thought, feeling, and expression, and along with this an always effective pianoforte language.”

Selected Compositions 
 2 Barcarollen, Op. 5
 Napoli
 Venezia
 Il Baccio, Celebre Valze d'Artini, Transcription de Concert, Op. 7
Fantasie sur de Airs bohèmiens nationaux, Op. 8
Souvenir de Hongrie, Polka de Concert, Op. 9
3 Characteristische Stücke, Op. 10
 Am Sontag Morgen, Idylle
 Scherzetto
 Romanze
 Weihnacht Idylle, Op. 11
 Nizza, Barcarolle, Op. 13
 Mozart, Op. 14
 Andante Favori
 Menuet Favori
 Adagio Favori
4 Poesion, Op. 15
 Nocturne
 Schummerlied
 Frühlingstraum
 Rublick, Lied ohne Worte
 Grand Fantasie sur l'Opera: Faust de Guonod, Op. 17
 3 Grandes Valses, Op. 18
 Sexten Etude, Op. 27
 La Coquette, Op. 29
 La Clochette, Op. 30
 4 Klavierstücke, Op. 40
 Scherzetto
 Nocturno
 Schummerlied
 Kleiner Walzer
 4 Klavierstücke, Op. 41
 Impromptu
Lied ohne Worte
 Etwas Seltames
 Leid ohne Worte
 Souvenir de Tyrol, Op. 49
 Polkas de Salon pour le Piano, Op.58. No.1 Polka gracieuse No.2 Polka de la Jeunesse heureuse (B. Schott's Söhnen, Mainz, Sweet Remembrance (In the Gondola),
 3 Idyllen, Op. 71
 Poetische Stunden am Klavier, Op. 73
 Polka brillante, Op. 81
 Galopp, Op. 86
 Souvenir d'Innsbruck (Tyrolliene de Salon), Op. 90
 Nocturne, Op. 92
 Afrikanerin, Op. 101
 2 Pieces, Op. 105
 Souvenir de Ischl
 Ricordanza
 Kriegsbilder, Op. 109
 Elegie, auf dem Tod eines gefallen Helden
 Zug munterer Krieger
 Der Sieger Heimkehr
 Erinnerungsblätter, Op. 110
 Abshied von der Geliebten
 Von der Schlacht
 Die Heimkehr
 3 Pieces, Op. 111, no. 3: Hommage a Chopin
 Repertoire de Concert, Op. 124
 Don Juan de Mozart
 Freischütz de Weber
 Lucrezia Borgia de Donizetti
 Le Muetta d'Auber
 Les Huguenotes de Meyerbeer
 Ballo in maschera de Verdi
 Rococo-Tanz, Op. 126
 Valse de Concert, Op. 128
 6 Deutsche Märchenbilder, Op. 135
 Frau Holle
 Schneewittchen
 Aschenbrödel
 Die Bremer Stadtmusikanten
 Rothkäppchen
 Hans im Glück
 Schweizer Bilder, Op. 137
 Abends auf der Heinwehfluh
 Alpenglühen der Jungfrau
 Auf dem Vierwaldstätter See
 Silberquelle im Chamouny-Tal
 Am Genfer See, Op. 139
 Sonntagsmorgen auf Glion
 Promenade á Châtelard, Bosquet de Julie
 Mondscheinfarht nach der Liebesinsel
 Goldelfest in Vevey
 Abschied von Genf
 6 Etuden, Op. 138
 Improvisation on the Weigenlied by Johannes Brahms, Op. 141
 Piano Trio, Op. posth. no. 2

External links

References

Sources
 Etude, vol. 15, no. 9, September, 1907
Rudolf Müller: "Bendel, Franz." In: Allgemeine Deutsche Biographie (ADB). Band 46, Duncker & Humblot, Leipzig 1902, S. 347 f.
The Monthly Musical Record, vol. 20–23, 1889-1893
 Bomberger, E. Douglas, Brainard’s Biographies of American Musicians (Connecticut: Greenwood Press) 1999.
 Flamant, Alexander, The Realm of Tones: Three Hundred and Two Portraits of the Most Celebrated European Musician with Short Biographical Notices (New York: Edward Schuberth & Co.), 1882.
 Bendel profile, usc.edu. Accessed November 11, 2022.

1833 births
1874 deaths
19th-century classical composers
19th-century classical pianists
19th-century German male musicians
19th-century German composers
19th-century Czech people
German Romantic composers
German classical pianists
German male classical composers
German male pianists
Male classical pianists
German Bohemian people
German people of German Bohemian descent
Austrian Empire emigrants to Germany
People from Krásná Lípa
Deaths from typhoid fever
Infectious disease deaths in Massachusetts